The Men's Discus Throw athletics events for the 2012 Summer Paralympics took place at the London Olympic Stadium from August 31 to September 7. A total of 10 events were contested incorporating 13 different classifications.

Schedule

There were no heats. However, in each event after the first three throws, the top eight had 3 extra throws.

Results
PR = Paralympic record;
RR = Regional record;
PB = Personal best;
SB = Season best;
NM = No mark;
DNS = Did not start.

F11

F32-33-34

F35-36

F37-38

F40

F42

F44

F51-52-53

F54-56

F57-58

References

Athletics at the 2012 Summer Paralympics
2012 in men's athletics